Giovanni D'Onofrio (25 August 1998) is an Italian rugby union player.
His usual position is as a Wing and he currently plays for Fiamme Oro in Top10.

For 2016–17 Pro12 (selected from F.I.R. Academy), 2017-18 and 2018–19 Pro14 seasons (under contract with Fiamme Oro), D'Onofrio was named as Permit Player for Zebre. 
From 2020 to 2022 he played for Zebre in United Rugby Championship with a Dual contract in order to play on loan as Permit Player with Fiamme Oro in Top10.

From 2017 to 2018 D'Onofrio was named in the Italy Under 20 squad  and from 2019 he is also part of the Italy Sevens squad to participate at the Qualifying Tournament for the 2020 Summer Olympics.

References

External links 
It's Rugby England Profile
Eurosport Profile

Sportspeople from Benevento
Italian rugby union players
Zebre Parma players
1998 births
Living people
Rugby union wings
Fiamme Oro Rugby players
Italy international rugby sevens players